Cédric Bétrémieux (born May 14, 1982) is a French footballer who is currently playing for Harelbeke in the Belgian Second Amateur Division. He previously played in the Belgian Pro League for Roeselare and Kortrijk.

References

1982 births
Living people
French footballers
AC Cambrai players
K.S.K. Ronse players
Entente Feignies Aulnoye FC players
K.V. Kortrijk players
K.S.V. Roeselare players
Oud-Heverlee Leuven players
R.R.C. Peruwelz players
ÉFC Fréjus Saint-Raphaël players
Paris Saint-Germain F.C. players
AFC Compiègne players
FC Istres players
Belgian Pro League players
French expatriate footballers
Expatriate footballers in Belgium
French expatriate sportspeople in Belgium
Association football forwards
People from Douai
Sportspeople from Nord (French department)
Footballers from Hauts-de-France